Group A was one of two groups of the 2022 IIHF World Championship. The four best placed teams advanced to the playoff round, while the last placed team was relegated to Division I in 2023.

Standings

Matches
All times are local (UTC+3).

France vs Slovakia

Germany vs Canada

Denmark vs Kazakhstan

Switzerland vs Italy

Slovakia vs Germany

Italy vs Canada

France vs Kazakhstan

Denmark vs Switzerland

Slovakia vs Canada

France vs Germany

Italy vs Denmark

Switzerland vs Kazakhstan

France vs Italy

Switzerland vs Slovakia

Germany vs Denmark

Canada vs Kazakhstan

Germany vs Italy

Kazakhstan vs Slovakia

Denmark vs France

Canada vs Switzerland

Italy vs Slovakia

Kazakhstan vs Germany

Switzerland vs France

Kazakhstan vs Italy

Canada vs Denmark

Germany vs Switzerland

Slovakia vs Denmark

Canada vs France

Notes

References

External links
Official website

A